Kumbhalgarh Wildlife Sanctuary is located in the Rajsamand District of Rajasthan State in western India. It is part of the Khathiar-Gir dry deciduous forests ecoregion.

Geography
It takes name after the impressive historic fort of Kumbhalgarh.  The wildlife sanctuary consists of a  core area and a  buffer area. It covers four hill and mountain ranges of the Aravalli: Kumbhalgarh range; Sadri range; Desuri range and the Bokhada range.  Twenty-two villages are located inside the sanctuary. The soils are generally thin, mostly of sandy loam. The base rocks are mainly metamorphic, from the Archean. The topography of the sanctuary can be divided into hills, piedmont and plain. The areas of plain have mostly been co-opted for crops.

Kumbhalgarh's natural environment attracts tourists, and is accessible from Udaipur and Nathdwara which are 100 km and 51 km respectively from the sanctuary. Foot tracking and horse safari organised by local tour operators are available. A typical safari route enters the sanctuary from the Kumbhalgarh Fort and cuts across the sanctuary to Ghanerao, and then follows an old abandoned road.

Fauna
The sanctuary is home to a variety of wildlife, some of which are endangered species. The wildlife includes the Indian wolf, Indian leopard, sloth bear, striped hyena, Golden jackal, jungle cat, sambhar, nilgai, chausingha (the four horned antelope), chinkara and Indian hare.  The leopard is the apex predator in the sanctuary.  The birds at Kumbhalgarh includes the normally shy and untrusting grey junglefowl. Peacocks and doves can be sighted feeding on grains scattered by the jungle guards. Birds like the red spurfowl, parakeet, golden oriole, grey pigeon, bulbul, dove and white breasted kingfisher can also be seen near the water holes.

Asiatic Lion Reintroduction Project

Kumbalgarh Sanctuary was one of the places that were considered for the reintroduction of the Asiatic lion. With the recent Supreme Court of India judgment favoring the relocation of lions over that of cheetahs in India, a proposal was made to the Government of Rajasthan, by wildlife conservationist Raza H. Tehsin in April 2009.

See also 
 Arid Forest Research Institute (AFRI)
 Wildlife of India

References

External links
 Kumbhalgarh
 Kumbhalgarh Information

Asiatic Lion Reintroduction Project
Khathiar-Gir dry deciduous forests
Tourist attractions in Rajsamand district
Wildlife sanctuaries in Rajasthan
1971 establishments in Rajasthan
Protected areas established in 1971